The Civil Service Faithful Service Medal (Treudienst-Ehrenzeichen für Beamte Angestellte und Arbeiter im öffentlichen Dienst) was a Nazi Germany medal of honor that was founded on 30 January 1938, in two grades, to reward civilians and military in the employ of the German public services for long and faithful service.

Description
All officials, employees, and laborers at any level of the public service (local, regional or national) who complete 25 or 40 years service were eligible.

The second class award was for 25 years of service was a silver cross, with a silver wreath and a black enameled swastika in the center of the cross.

The first class award was for 40 years of service was a gold cross, with a gold wreath and a black enameled swastika in the center of the cross.

The reverse of both classes was stamped with 'Für treue Dienste' (For faithful Services). The ribbon for the medal is cornflower blue.

Orders, decorations, and medals of Nazi Germany
Long service medals